The 2017 Giro d'Italia was the 100th edition of the Giro d'Italia, one of cycling's Grand Tour races. The race started on 5 May in Alghero on the island of Sardinia, and ended on 28 May in Milan. The race was won by Tom Dumoulin, who became the first Dutch male winner of the Giro.

Teams

All 18 UCI WorldTeams were automatically invited and were obliged to attend the race. Four wildcard UCI Professional Continental teams were also selected.

The teams entering the race were:

Pre-race favorites
The main pre-race favorites were Nairo Quintana and Vincenzo Nibali. Other general classification contenders were Geraint Thomas and Mikel Landa, Steven Kruijswijk, Thibaut Pinot, Tom Dumoulin, Adam Yates, Bauke Mollema, Ilnur Zakarin, Tejay van Garderen, Bob Jungels and Domenico Pozzovivo.

Sprinters at the Giro include Fernando Gaviria, Caleb Ewan, André Greipel, Jasper Stuyven, Sacha Modolo, Giacomo Nizzolo, Sam Bennett and Ryan Gibbons.

Route and stages

Details about the first three stages of the race were unveiled at a press conference on 14 September 2016. The remainder of the route was unveiled by race director Mauro Vegni on 25 October 2016. However, organizers RCS Sport leaked the route on their website the day before the official presentation.

The Cima Coppi (the race's highest elevation) was the Stelvio Pass, summited during stage 16. The stages were categorised in four ways by race organisers; time trials, low, medium and high difficulty.

Race overview

Lukas Pöstlberger won the first stage, André Greipel claimed the second and Fernando Gaviria the third. From there Bob Jungels would wear the Pink jersey as Gaviria went on to win three more stages and lock up the points classification. As the race entered the mountains the leader's jersey swapped between Nairo Quintana and Tom Dumoulin going into the penultimate time trial where Quintana was in 1st and Dumoulin in 4th. Domenico Pozzovivo, Ilnur Zakarin, Vincenzo Nibali and Thibaut Pinot, who had just won the final mountain stage, were all within 90 seconds of Quintana. During the final time trial Dumoulin finished 2nd to fellow Dutchman Jos van Emden, but beat all of the GC contenders handily claiming the Giro victory thirty seconds ahead of Quintana as Nibali finalized the podium. This was the first grand tour victory by a Dutch rider in nearly four decades.

Doping
On the eve of the Giro d'Italia, the UCI announced that two  riders, Stefano Pirazzi and Nicola Ruffoni, had tested positive for GH-Releasing Peptides (GHRPs) – defined as peptide hormones, growth factors, or mimetics – in samples collected during out-of-competition doping tests conducted on 25 and 26 April 2017.
With the team incurring first and second AAFs within a twelve-month period, the UCI aimed to enforce article 7.12.1 of the UCI Anti-Doping Rules, allowing for suspension of the team from 15 to 45 days – casting doubt on their Giro appearance.

Classification leadership
In the Giro d'Italia, four different jerseys are awarded:

 The first and most important is the general classification, calculated by adding each rider's finishing times on each stage. Riders receive time bonuses (10, 6 and 4 seconds respectively) for finishing in the first three places on each stage, excluding the two individual time trial stages. The rider with the lowest cumulative time is awarded the pink jersey, and is considered the winner of the Giro d'Italia.

 Additionally, there is a points classification. Riders win points for finishing in the top placings on each stage, except the time trials. Flat stages award more points than mountainous stages, meaning that this classification tends to favour sprinters. In addition, points can be won in intermediate sprints. The leader of the points classification wore the cyclamen jersey, awarded for the first time since 2009.

 There is also a mountains classification, for which points were awarded for reaching the top of a climb before other riders. Each climb was categorised as either first, second, third or fourth-category, with more points available for the more difficult, higher-categorised climbs. For first-category climbs, the top eight riders earned points; on second-category climbs, six riders won points; on third-category climbs, only the top four riders earned points with three on fourth-category climbs. The leadership of the mountains classification was marked by a blue jersey. The Cima Coppi, the race's highest point of elevation, awards more points than the other first-category climbs, with nine riders scoring points. At , the Cima Coppi for the 2017 Giro d'Italia is the Stelvio Pass.
 The fourth jersey represents the young rider classification. This is decided the same way as the general classification, but only riders born after 1 January 1992 are eligible. The winner of the classification is awarded a white jersey.
 There are also two classifications for teams. In the Trofeo Fast Team classification, the times of the best three cyclists per team on each stage are added up; the leading team is one with the lowest total time. The Trofeo Super Team is a team points classification, with the top 20 riders of each stage earning points for their team.

Several other minor classifications are awarded:

 The first is the intermediate sprint classification. Each road stage has two sprints – the Traguardi Volanti. The first riders across the intermediate sprint lines are awarded points; the rider with the most points at the end of the race wins the classification. This classification was won by Daniel Teklehaimanot.
 Another classification – the combativity prize – involves points awarded to the first riders at the stage finishes, at intermediate sprints, and at the summits of categorised climbs. This classification was won by Mikel Landa.
 There is also a breakaway award. For this, points are awarded to each rider in any breakaway smaller than 10 riders that escapes for at least . Each rider is awarded a point for each kilometre that the rider was away from the peloton. The rider with the most points at the end of the Giro wins the award. This classification was won by Pavel Brutt.
 The final classification is a "fair play" ranking for each team. Teams are given penalty points for infringing various rules. These range from half-point penalties, for offences that merit warnings from race officials, to a 2000-point penalty, for a positive doping test. The team that has the lowest points total at the end of the Giro wins the classification.

Final standings

General classification

Points classification

Mountains classification

Young rider classification

Trofeo Fast Team

Trofeo Super Team

References

Footnotes

Citations

Bibliography

External links

 

 
Giro d'Italia by year
Giro d'Italia
Giro d'Italia
Giro d'Italia